Eraj Rajabov (born 9 November 1990) is a Tajikistani footballer who plays for Ravshan Zafarobod, and the Tajikistan national football team.

Career

Club
Previously, Rajabov played for Dinamo Dushanbe.

Rajabov was released by FC Istiklol at the end of the 2015 season.
On 4 January 2016, Rajabov was registered by FK Khujand for their 2016 AFC Cup campaign. Rajabov played the first league game of the season for Khayr Vahdat.

On 31 March 2020, Rajabov was listed in FK Fayzkand's squad for the 2020 Tajikistan Higher League season.

On 31 March 2021, Rajabov was listed in FC Dushanbe-83's squad for the 2021 Tajikistan Higher League season.

On 1 April 2022, Rajabov was listed in Ravshan Zafarobod's squad for the 2022 Tajikistan Higher League season.

International
He played for Tajikistan in 2007 FIFA U-17 World Cup, 2008 AFC Challenge Cup, 2012 AFC Challenge Cup.

Career statistics

Club

International

Statistics accurate as of match played 13 November 2016

Honors
Istiklol
 Tajik League (4): 2010, 2011, 2014, 2015
 Tajik Cup (4): 2009, 2010, 2013, 2014
 Tajik Supercup (1) : 2014

References

External links
 

1990 births
Living people
Tajikistani footballers
Association football defenders
Tajikistan international footballers
Place of birth missing (living people)
Tajikistan Higher League players
FC Istiklol players
Tajikistan youth international footballers